Margaritasite is a yellow, caesium-bearing mineral in the carnotite group. Its chemical formula is (Cs, K, H3O)2(UO2)2V2O8·H2O and its crystal system is monoclinic (space group P21/a).

Name and discovery
It was first described in 1982 from the Margaritas uranium deposit in the Peña Blanca district of the municipality of Aldama, in the Mexican state of Chihuahua.

See also
 List of minerals

References

Vanadate minerals
Caesium minerals
Potassium minerals
Uranium(VI) minerals
Monoclinic minerals
Minerals in space group 14
Minerals described in 1982